Lin Chia-yu (born 30 June 1993) is a Taiwanese badminton player. In 2011, he won the gold medal at the Asian Junior Championships in the men's doubles event partnered with Huang Po-jui. He also won the silver medal at the World Junior Championships.

He is married to former doubles partner Hsu Ya-ching.

Achievements

BWF World Junior Championships 
Boys' doubles

Asian Junior Championships 
Boys' doubles

BWF Grand Prix (1 runner-up) 
The BWF Grand Prix had two levels, the BWF Grand Prix and Grand Prix Gold. It was a series of badminton tournaments sanctioned by the Badminton World Federation (BWF) and held from 2007 to 2017.

Men's doubles

  BWF Grand Prix Gold tournament
  BWF Grand Prix tournament

BWF International Challenge/Series (3 titles, 2 runners-up) 
Men's doubles

Mixed doubles

  BWF International Challenge tournament
  BWF International Series tournament
  BWF Future Series tournament

References

External links 
 
 

1993 births
Living people
People from Yunlin County
Taiwanese male badminton players